Lyons is an unincorporated community and census-designated place (CDP) in Minnehaha County, South Dakota, United States. The CDP had a population of 70 at the 2020 census. Lyons has been assigned the ZIP code of 57041.

Lyons was laid out in 1886, and named after Lyons Township.

Demographics

References

Unincorporated communities in Minnehaha County, South Dakota
Sioux Falls, South Dakota metropolitan area
Unincorporated communities in South Dakota